Pokagon may refer to  either of two Potawatomi chiefs:

Leopold Pokagon
Pokagon Band of Potawatomi Indians, his band
Simon Pokagon, son of Leopold

There are also places named after them:

Pokagon State Park, Steuben County, Indiana
Pokagon Township, Michigan, which includes the unincorporated community of Pokagon